The North Korean Ambassador to the Court of St James's in London is the official representative of the government of North Korea to the government of the United Kingdom.

List of ambassadors

See also
North Korea–United Kingdom relations

References 

 
United Kingdom
Korea North